The Wheel of Life is a 1929 American pre-Code romantic drama sound film directed by Victor Schertzinger and starring  Richard Dix and Esther Ralston. It was produced and distributed by Paramount Pictures.

Cast
Richard Dix as Captain Leslie Yeullet
Esther Ralston as Ruth Dangan
O. P. Heggie as Colonel John Dangan
Arthur Hoyt as George Faraker
Myrtle Stedman as Mrs. Faraker
Larry Steers as Major
Regis Toomey as Lt. MacLaren
Nigel De Brulier as Tsering Lama
George Regas as Bit Role (uncredited)

References

External links

The Wheel of Life at New York Times
The Wheel of Life at TCMDB
Still at gettyimages.com

1929 films
Paramount Pictures films
Films directed by Victor Schertzinger
American films based on plays
American black-and-white films
American romantic drama films
1929 romantic drama films
1920s American films